Lotte van Hoek (born 8 August 1991) is a Dutch former professional racing cyclist, who rode professionally between 2015 and 2018, for the Feminine Cycling Team and .

See also
 List of 2015 UCI Women's Teams and riders

References

External links
 

1991 births
Living people
Dutch female cyclists
People from Heusden
Cyclists from North Brabant
21st-century Dutch women